Sidbury is a village and civil parish  south-east of Shrewsbury, in the Shropshire district, in the ceremonial county of Shropshire, England. In 2001 the parish had a population of 32. Sidbury shared a parish council with Stottesdon. The parish touches Stottesdon, Deuxhill, Middleton Scriven and Billingsley.

Features 
There are nine listed buildings in Sidbury. Sidbury has a church called Holy Trinity Church.

History 
The name Sidbury means "south fortification". Sidbury was recorded in the Domesday Book as Sudberie. There are earthworks of Sidbury deserted medieval village.

References 

Villages in Shropshire
Civil parishes in Shropshire